Yin Chung-jung (16 April 1903-24 January 1963), real name Yin Guoyong, also known in the West as K. Y. Yin, was a senior government official of the Republic of China who is widely viewed as the main architect of Taiwan's economic policy in the 1950s.  He played an instrumental role in Taiwan's economic stabilization in the 1950s and was one of few Taiwanese officials in that period who consistently promoted free trade.

Background and early career

Yin's ancestral home was in Taiyi Township (Tuanshan Town, Shaodong County-level city), Shaoyang Prefecture, Hunan. His grandfather Yin Xilun was a scholar in the late Qing Dynasty. Yin graduated in 1925 from the Electrical Machinery Department of Nanyang University (predecessor of Shanghai Jiao Tong University). Because of his excellent grades, he was recommended to work in the Ministry of Transport after graduation. Later, because of his friendship with T. V. Soong, he was transferred to a private company funded by the Soong family. When T. V. Soong served in the cabinet and served as the chairman of the Guangdong Provincial Government, Yin Zhongrong was also responsible for power generation, coal mines and other matters under him.

In 1949, after the Second World War, Yin was invited by the government of the Republic of China to join the cabinet. In addition to being in charge of the Central Trust of China, he also served as the vice chairman of the Taiwan District Production Management Committee, responsible for industrial regeneration and external procurement. He also participated in the plan to transfer funds from Shanghai to Taiwan during the Chinese Civil War, and was responsible for liaison tasks between Shanghai and Taiwan.

In 1950, the government of the Republic of China moved to Taiwan. Yin Chung-jung, together with Li Kwoh-ting, Yen Chia-kan, and Sun Yun-suan, was among the main officials in charge of finance and foreign trade. In 1951, the United States provided financial support to the Republic of China for an annual amount of US$100 million, and Yin participated in the overall planning and use of US aid funds.

Minister of Economic Affairs

Yin Chung-jung, who was not a member of the Kuomintang, was nevertheless greatly appreciated by Vice President Chen Cheng for his abilities. Before Chen stepped down as Premier in June 1954, Yin was appointed Minister of Economic Affairs and Director of the Central Trust.

As Yin had worked in private companies in Shanghai and had in-depth experience of markets, he actively promoted the idea of a "planned market economy" after taking office as Minister of Economy, planning and implementing import substitution and export-oriented policies, and reforming foreign exchange trade measures. Yin's reform of foreign exchange has been later known as Taiwan's "first round of economic liberalization".

Under the belief in import substitution, he controlled the import of Japanese fabrics, and shifted to importing cotton as a substitute, which fostered the development of the domestic textile industry and enabled many well-known Taiwanese enterprises to gain a steady foothold from then on. In addition, under his authority over foreign exchange measures, he was the first government official to relax foreign exchange controls and encourage exports. This policy quickly promoted the growth of Taiwan's plastics and glass industries.

Yangtse Timber incident

In 1955, the Yangtse Timber Company closed down due to poor management. In March, legislator Guo Zijun pointed out that after the bankruptcy, the Central Trust had lent the company a large amount of money and claimed compensation. Since Yin was both the Minister of Economic Affairs and the director of the Central Trust, he was prosecuted in July of the same year. On 30 October 1955, a Taiwanese court acquitted Yin, but he took political responsibility and announced his resignation from both positions.

Yin Chung-jung was the first cabinet member of the Republic of China to be prosecuted and the first to resign from his executive duties.

Economic Security Council and Bank of Taiwan

In 1957, the Taiwan Production Committee that was still chaired by Yin was reorganized into the Economic Stability Committee, with Yin as its secretary-general. In 1958, Yin also served as the vice chairman of the American Aid Association. During the period, Yin assisted private enterprises with official policies such as tariff protection and restrictions on the establishment of factories, applied for US aid on their behalf, and then tracked and evaluated them afterwards to avoid failure.

In 1960, Yin Chung-jung became chairman of the Bank of Taiwan. During his tenure as chairman, he encouraged savings, stabilized prices, and promoted active lending to domestic small and medium-sized enterprises. During his tenure, he led the bank's low interest rate policy, so that market funds were transferred from savings banks to the capital market.

In early 1961, in order to facilitate market circulation, the Bank of Taiwan prepared to issue straight hundred-NTD bills. Because of the warning of inflation caused by the large-denomination gold-dollar bills and the Old Taiwan dollar in 1947, the plan to issue large bills caused anxiety among the Taiwanese public. In the face of the announcement of the suspension of the issuance of hundred-dollar bills, Yin stood alone and insisted on implementing the plan as scheduled. Soon, the straight hundred-dollar bills were scheduled to be issued on 19 June 1961, and under the supervision of the Bank of Taiwan and other institutions, the feared episode of inflation did not occur.

Yin Chung-jung died of liver cancer in Taipei on 24 January 1963, at the age of 59. Many observers thought the illness was related to overworking.

Assessment

Because he served in the Shanghai consortium in his early years, Yin Chung-jung strongly believed in the importance of the market economy. Under this concept, in addition to strengthening private competitiveness and import substitution, he has always advocated that planned free trade can promote economic growth. This policy, which was supported by academic scholars, ceased to be the mainstream of Taiwan's economic policy after he resigned as Minister in 1955. It is generally believed that the suspension of Yin's free trade policy also indirectly caused the appearance of a bubble economy caused by Taiwan's excessively high foreign exchange deposits in the late 1980s.

In addition, although some people think that his practice of coaching private enterprises is suspected of supporting consortia, in general, his market economy and the development of local enterprises were quite successful in the context of Taiwan and its largely trade-oriented economy.

Yin was considered extremely honest, living a thrifty life. He once received more than 400,000 US dollars in commissions for negotiating trade affairs with Japan, all of which he donated for public use. There were rumors that his family needed to rely on other people's support for their livelihood. After Yin died, he did not even have funeral expenses. This generated a national uproar after the matter became public. Yin's deeds were included in "The Biography of Famous People in the Republic of China".

Despite his background in science and engineering, Yin also has a solid knowledge of Chinese literature and culture. During his tenure at the Transport Ministry, he began to compile the chronicle of Guo Songtao, one of China's first diplomatic envoys to foreign countries, and also helped write annotations to the Lüshi Chunqiu.

According to Hoover Institution scholar Ramon H. Myers, Yin "was probably the most brilliant technocrat-official of the 1950s. He was largely responsible for persuading key government officials to reform the foreign exchange system in order to orientate Taiwan's economy to the world market." 

Yin is considered the mentor of Li Kwoh-ting (K. T. Li), another key protagonist of the Taiwan Miracle.  Scholar Ezra Vogel has called Yin and Li the "two great leaders of economic modernization" in Taiwan.

Family

Yin served his mother Shi Shouzhen with filial piety. He celebrated his mother's 90th birthday at the Grand Hotel in 1962. She died on 18 October 1963 at the age of 91. He had a younger brother, Yin Shuming. His wife, Cheng Zhanying, worked in the Linda Garden, a flower shop on Nanjing East Road, around 1965. The main reason for her flower shop was to earn income and invest in relief of outstanding middle school students.

See also
 Sun Yun-suan
 Wu Tingju

Notes

Taiwanese Ministers of Economic Affairs
Finance in Taiwan
1903 births
1963 deaths
Academic staff of the National Sun Yat-sen University
Members of the Kuomintang
People from Shaodong
National Chiao Tung University alumni
Economic Affairs Ministers of the Republic of China
Taiwanese people from Hunan